The Union Multipurpose Activity Center (also known as the UMAC or John Q. Hammons Arena) is a 5,662-seat multipurpose arena located in Tulsa, Oklahoma.  Built in 2003 at a cost of $22 million, it is the home of the Union High School Redhawks basketball team. It hosted The Summit League's men's basketball tournament from 2005 to 2008.

The arena contains 2,934 permanent seats and can host concerts, trade shows ( of space at the arena floor), conventions, and other events.  There are 6 concession stands and 14 restrooms divided equally between the men and women.  The center scoreboard at the UMAC features a 6' x 8' video screen.

References

External links
Union Multipurpose Activity Center
UMAC Basketball Court
UMAC Indoor View
UMAC Football Field
UMAC Football Field 2
UMAC Aerial View

Indoor arenas in Oklahoma
Convention centers in Oklahoma
Sports venues in Tulsa, Oklahoma
Basketball venues in Oklahoma
College basketball venues in the United States
Buildings and structures in Tulsa, Oklahoma
2003 establishments in Oklahoma
Sports venues completed in 2003
Union Public Schools